Capri Village is a small suburb forming part of the greater area of Noordhoek on the Cape Peninsula, South Africa, situated between Kommetjie, De Oude Weg, Fish Hoek and  Noordhoek.

References

Suburbs of Cape Town